Menka is a Grassfields language of Cameroon. Other names include Mamwoh and Wando Bando. It is spoken by an estimated 5,200 people.

References

Sources
Blench, Roger (2010) Classification of Momo and West Momo

Southwest Grassfields languages
Languages of Cameroon